Carl Morten Iversen (born 1 May 1948) is a Norwegian jazz musician (upright bass), and the son of jazz violinist Arild Iversen (1920–65). He is known from numerous recordings and has long been central to the Oslo Jazz scene.

Career 
Iversen was born in Oslo, and began playing as an accompanist for folk singers from 1965; among others, he played with Lars Klevstrand at Moldejazz Festival in 1968 and 1973, attended an album with Lillebjørn Nilsen in 1974, and got into jazz in 1970. He studied jazz in the United States until 1972, and when returning he played in a variety of bands from 1973, including with the Balke brothers, Jon Balke Quartet and Ditlef Eckhoff Quintet 1973–74, Magni Wentzel Quintet 1974–76 and 1979–84 with the album Sofies plass (1983), Guttorm Guttormsen Quartet 1974–80 with the albums Soturnudi (1975) and Albufeira (1979).

Iversen was president/chairman of the "Norwegian Jazz Forum" 1972–75, leader of "Foreningen norske jazzmusikere", editor of "Jazznytt", and Awarded Buddyprisen 1988. With guitarist Jon Eberson he has released duoalbums Jazz for men (2001), Standards (2003) and Levende på Fyret (2006), and recently he has recorded with Magni Wentzel Sekstett Live (2009).

Honors 
Buddyprisen 1988
Spellemannsprisen 1988 in the class Jazz for the album Nonsentration (1992), within Oslo 13

Discography (in selection) 

Within Guttorm Guttormsen Quartet
1975: Soturnudi
1979: Albufeira

Within Per Husby Septet
1976: Peacemaker

Within Oslo 13
1981: Anti therapy (Odin Records)
1988: Off balance (Odin Records)
1992: Nonsentration (ECM Records), Awarded Spellemannprisen 1992 in the class Jazz
1992: Live (Curling Legs)

Trio with Armen Donelian & Audun Kleive
1988: Trio 87 (Odin Records)

Trio with Frank Jakobsen & Rob Waring
1991: Secret Red Thread (Odin Records)
2001: Synchronize your watches (Curling Legs)

Trio with Olga Konkova & Audun Kleive
1997: Going with the Flow (Curling Legs)

Duo with Jon Eberson
2001: Jazz For Men (Curling Legs)
2003: Standards (Curling Legs)
2006: Levende På Fyret (Curling Legs)

Within Jon Eberson Trio
2009: Born to be slow (NorCD), with Rob Waring

With Magni Wentzel
1983: Sofies plass (Hot Club Records), within M.W. Quartet
2009: Live (Curling Legs)

References

External links 
Carl Morten Iversen Biography from Norsk Musikkinformasjon

1948 births
Living people
Musicians from Oslo
Spellemannprisen winners
ECM Records artists
Norwegian jazz upright-bassists
Male double-bassists
Jazz double-bassists
Norwegian jazz composers
Male jazz composers
21st-century double-bassists
21st-century Norwegian male musicians
1300 Oslo members
Extended Noise members